The Auckland International is a badminton open international championships held in Auckland, New Zealand. The tournament was classified as "International Series" by the Badminton World Federation (BWF) and provided an opportunity for players to compete for BWF points. The 2011 tournament held in Manukau, and classified as "Future Series".

Previous winners

References

External links
Badminton World Federation
BWF Fansite

Badminton tournaments in New Zealand
1995 establishments in New Zealand